Predrag is a Slavic masculine given name, predominantly borne by ethnic Slavs, derived from pre- ("very, much") and -drag ("dear, beloved"), both common in Slavic dithematic names. It roughly means "very beloved". The usual nickname is Peđa (Pedja). It may refer to:

 Predrag Balašević, ethnic Romanian politician from Serbia
 Predrag Cvitanović, Croatian physicist and academic
 Predrag Danilović, Serbian basketball player
 Peđa Grbin, Croatian lawyer and politician
 Predrag Krunić, Bosnia and Herzegovina basketball coach
Predrag Lazić, Serbian professional footballer 
 Predrag Marković, Serbian politician, author, and historian
 Predrag Matvejević, Yugoslav writer and scholar
 Predrag Mijatović, Yugoslavian football player
 Predrag Samardžiski, Macedonian basketball player
 Predrag Stojaković, Serbian basketball player

References

External links
 http://www.behindthename.com/name/predrag

Slavic masculine given names
Croatian masculine given names
Montenegrin masculine given names
Serbian masculine given names
Bulgarian masculine given names